The 2009–10 UCF Knights men's basketball team was an NCAA Division I college basketball team that represented the University of Central Florida and competed in Conference USA. They played their home games at the UCF Arena in Orlando, Florida, and were led by head coach Kirk Speraw who was in his 17th and final season with the team. In the previous year, the Knights finished the season 17–14, 7–9 in C-USA play.

In February 2012, UCF vacated its wins from the 2009–10 season after it was discovered that there was an ineligible player on the team.

Roster

Coaches

Schedule and results

|-
!colspan=8| Exhibition

|-
!colspan=8| Regular season (Non-conference play)
|-

|-
!colspan=8| Regular season (C-USA conference play)
|-

|-
!colspan=8| C-USA tournament
|-

|-
| colspan="8" | *Non-Conference Game. Rankings from AP poll. All times are in Eastern Time.
|}

Postseason
Following the conclusion of the season, on March 15, 2010, Speraw was fired as head basketball coach. Speraw had amassed a 279-233 record over a 17-year stretch as the Knights head coach. On March 30, UCF announced current Marshall head coach, Donnie Jones, as the new UCF head coach.

See also
 List of UCF Knights men's basketball seasons

References

External links

Official UCF athletics site

UCF Knights men's basketball seasons
UCF
UCF Knights
UCF Knights